Golden flax is a common name for several plants in the flax family (Linaceae), and may refer to:
Flax, the golden colored seeds produced by some forms of the widely cultivated blue-flowered flax species, Linum usitatissimum
Linum flavum, a species native to Europe, with golden flowers